Thomas W. Bryant Stadium is a multi-purpose stadium in Lakeland, Florida that is currently home to Lakeland High School athletics and the Lakeland Tropics soccer team of USL League Two. It is named for Thomas W. Bryant, a Lakeland native lawyer, legislator, and donor to the University of Florida. Bryant Stadium is just to the north of Henley Field.

In August 2017, Polk County Public Schools purchased Bryant Stadium from the City of Lakeland at a cost of $1.2 million.

External links
 Stadium page at LakelandFootball.com

References

Soccer venues in Florida
Sports venues in Lakeland, Florida
Multi-purpose stadiums in the United States
1941 establishments in Florida
Sports venues completed in 1941
High school football venues in the United States
Lacrosse venues in the United States
College lacrosse venues in the United States
Florida Tropics SC